Tompkin is a surname. Notable people with the surname include:

Maurice Tompkin (1919–1956), English cricketer and footballer
Percy Tompkin (1894–1950), English footballer

See also
Tomkin
Tompkins (disambiguation)